Richard Godfrey may refer to:

Richard Godfrey (potter) (1949–2014), English studio potter
Richard Godfrey (died 1642) (1592–1642), MP for New Romney
Richard Godfrey (died 1631), MP for Salisbury
Richard Godfrey (priest), priest and missionary in Melanesia
Dick Godfrey, Australian rules footballer

See also
Richard Godfrey Rivers (1859–1925), English artist, active in Australia